Ehsaas Programme is a social safety and poverty alleviation programme launched by Government of Pakistan in March 2019. Prime Minister of Pakistan Imran Khan called it a key initiative towards a welfare state that PTI promised with people of Pakistan in their elections manifesto. It is aimed at uplifting the backward class, reducing inequality, investment on masses and lifting the lagging districts in the country. A separate ministry was established under Poverty Alleviation and Social Safety Division which is headed by Special Assistant to Prime Minister Sania Nishtar who previously was serving as chairperson of Benazir Income Support Programme. As of 2021, Ehsaas Programme has two major pillars, one is Ehsaas Emergency Cash (introduced during the COVID-19 pandemic) and the other is Ehsaas Kafalat, the latter programme expanded its coverage from 7 million people to 10 million people in 2021.

The "Ehsaas Emergency Cash" programme was Imran Khan's flagship welfare policy during the COVID-19 pandemic, it received praise from the World Bank which listed it amongst the top global social protection measures and said that it ranked highly in terms of actual coverage rates compared to planned coverage rates. During the pandemic, the welfare programme covered millions of lower-income Pakistani families with monthly stipends handed out to 13.2 million people.

Background 
Imran Khan's Pakistan Tehreek-e-Insaf contested in 2018 Pakistani General Elections and promised in his party manifesto to launch different social safety programmes and will retain and improve the Benazir Income Support Programme.

Objective 
Ehsaas programme is a flagship social protection lead towards a ‘welfare state’ that is embodied in Constitution of Pakistan. It is to create precision safety nets; promoting financial inclusion and access to digital services; supporting the economic empowerment of women; focusing on the central role of human capital formation for poverty eradication, economic growth and sustainable development; and overcoming financial barriers to accessing health and post-secondary education.

Article 38(D) in chapter Principles of Policy of the Constitution of Pakistan is about the promotion of social and economic well-being of the people. The government through a constitutional amendment vows to make food, clothing, housing, education and medical relief as fundamental rights of the citizens and the duty of state.

Eligibility 
The programme is for the extreme poor, orphans, widows, the homeless, the disabled, those who risk medical impoverishment, for the jobless, for poor farmers, for laborers, for the sick and undernourished; for students from low-income backgrounds and for poor women and elderly citizens. This plan is also about lifting lagging areas where poverty is higher.

Programme structure 
Ehsaas was formally launched on 27 March 2019 by federal government. It included different social safety programs like Ehsaas Emergency Cash Program, Ehsaas Panaah Gah, Ehsaas Taleemi Wazif, Ehsaas Petrol Card, Ehsaas Ration Riyaat, Ehsaas Scholarships etc, that are aimed to uplift the social security of masses. Its poverty reduction strategy is articulated in four pillars and it currently embodies 134 policy actions. The key initiatives include Ehsaas Kafaalat, Ehsaas Aamdan, Ehsaas Emergency Cash during covid pandemic, Ehsaas Scholarships, Ehsaas Cash Assistance for women etc. Benazir Income Support Programme was also made the part of Poverty Alleviation and Social Security Division.

Reception 
Ehsaas programme has been viewed as a success by national and international experts. It was helpful in bringing a positive change and is seen as a global model for poverty reduction. World Bank doubled its assistance for the programme seeing the progress and declared it role model for other countries. Ehsaas Emergency Cash Programme during COVID-19 pandemic in the country successfully protected the poor and daily wagers who were affected in lockdowns by providing cash disbursements. SAPM Dr. Sania Nishtar has been accredited as the person behind the programme's success.

See also 

 Benazir Income Support Programme

References 

2019 introductions
Government aid programs
Welfare in Pakistan
Imran Khan administration
Pakistan Tehreek-e-Insaf